Parliamentary elections were held in Serbia on 28 December 2003 to elect members of the National Assembly.

Serbia had been in a state of political crisis since the overthrow of the post-communist ruler, Slobodan Milošević, in 2001. The reformers, led by former Yugoslav President Vojislav Koštunica, have been unable to gain control of the Serbian presidency because three successive presidential elections have failed to produce the required 50% turnout. The assassination in March 2003 of reformist Prime Minister, Zoran Đinđić was a major setback.

At these elections the former reformist alliance, the Democratic Opposition of Serbia (DOS), had broken up into three parts: Koštunica's Democratic Party of Serbia, late Prime Minister Đinđić's Democratic Party and the G17 Plus group of liberal economists led by Miroljub Labus.

Opposing them were the nationalist Serbian Radical Party of Vojislav Šešelj and Milošević's Socialist Party of Serbia (descended from the former Communist Party). At the time of the election, both Šešelj and Milošević were in detention at ICTY, Milošević accused of committing war crimes, Šešelj of inspiring them.

The remaining candidate was the monarchist Serbian Renewal Movement–New Serbia (SPO–NS) coalition, led by Vuk Drašković.

Following the election the three former DOS parties (DSS, DS and G17+) fell two seats short of a parliamentary majority, holding 124 seats between them. After months of coalition talks Koštunica, Labus and Drašković's parties reach an agreement with the outside support of the Socialist Party in March 2004 which enabled Koštunica of the DSS to become prime minister.

Electoral lists 
Following electoral lists took part in the 2003 parliamentary election:

Results

References

Serbia
Elections in Serbia
Elections in Serbia and Montenegro
Serbia